Cell division cycle-associated protein 7 is a protein that in humans is encoded by the CDCA7 gene.

This gene was identified as a c-Myc responsive gene, and behaves as a direct c-Myc target gene. Overexpression of this gene is found to enhance the transformation of lymphoblastoid cells, and it complements a transformation-defective Myc Box II mutant, suggesting its involvement in c-Myc-mediated cell transformation. Two alternatively spliced transcript variants encoding distinct isoforms have been reported.

References

External links

Further reading